Betty Lynne (1911–2011) was a British film actress. During the late 1930s she played the female lead in a number of quota quickies, several of them for Warner Bros. at Teddington Studios. In 1939 she co-starred with Robert Newton in the thriller Dead Men are Dangerous.

Lynne was educated at Godwin Girls College in England, a convent in France, and the Royal Academy of Dramatic Art in London. She appeared on Broadway in The Animal Kingdom (1932) and Escape Me Never (1935).

Selected filmography
 Take It from Me (1937)
 Saturday Night Revue (1937)
 French Leave (1937)
 Patricia Gets Her Man (1937)
 It's Not Cricket (1937)
 Mr. Satan (1938)
 The Viper (1938)
 Wanted by Scotland Yard (1938)
 Glamour Girl (1938)
 Dead Men are Dangerous (1939)
 That's the Ticket (1940)
 Portrait from Life (1948)
 Once Upon a Dream (1949)
 The Bad Lord Byron (1949)

References

Bibliography 
 Goble, Alan. The Complete Index to Literary Sources in Film. Walter de Gruyter, 1999.

External links 
 

1911 births
2011 deaths
People from Berlin
British film actresses